The 1992 Copenhagen Open was a men's tennis tournament played on indoor carpet courts in Copenhagen, Denmark that was part of the World Series of the 1992 ATP Tour. It was the sixth edition of the tournament and was held from 2 March through 8 March 1992. Eighth-seeded Magnus Larsson won the singles title.

Finals

Singles

 Magnus Larsson defeated  Anders Järryd, 6–4, 7–6(7–5)
 It was Larsson's 1st singles title of the year and the 2nd of his career.

Doubles

 Nicklas Kulti /  Magnus Larsson defeated  Hendrik Jan Davids /  Libor Pimek, 6–3, 6–4

References

External links
 ITF tournament edition details

Copenhagen Open
Copenhagen Open
1992 in Danish tennis